The DS3 is an AC electric locomotive manufactured by Dnipropetrovsk research-and-production association for electric locomotive engineering (NPO DEVZ) jointly with Siemens.

Equipment
Siemens provided the power electronics while DEVZ produced the chassis, traction motors, auxiliary machinery etc.

Use

The DS3 was designed as a dual-purpose locomotive for both passenger and freight service, but now is used primarily for pulling express passenger trains.

References

External links 
 DEVZ website, archived copy

25 kV AC locomotives
Railway locomotives introduced in 2003
Electric locomotives of Ukraine